Once Around is an album released November 2, 2010 by The Autumn Defense. It is the band's fourth full-length release.

Track listing 
 "Back of My Mind" (Sansone) - 3:12
 "Allow Me" (Stirratt, Sansone) - 4:21
 "Tell Me What You Want" (Sansone) - 5:26
 "Huntington Fair" (Stirratt, Sansone) - 3:38
 "Once Around" (Sansone) - 6:29
 "The Rift" (Stirratt) - 3:07
 "The Swallows of London Town" (Sansone) - 3:26
 "Step Easy" (Stirratt) - 2:59
 "Don't Know" (Sansone) - 3:57
 "Every Day" (Sansone) - 3:37
 "There Will Always Be a Way" (Sansone, Stirratt) - 4:15

Personnel
The Autumn Defense
Patrick Sansone - lead vocals (1, 3, 5, 7, 9, 10, 11), backing vocals (2, 6, 8), acoustic guitar (3, 5, 6, 7, 9, 10, 11), electric guitar (1, 3, 5, 7, 8, 10, 11), bass (2, 4, 5, 6, 8, 9, 10), percussion (1, 4, 5, 8, 10), piano (1, 2, 6), celeste (1, 11), Wurlitzer (2), Mellotron (4, 5), 12-string guitar (4, 8), Rhodes (5), marimba (7), glockenspiel (11)
John Stirratt - lead vocals (2, 4, 6, 8), backing vocals (1, 3, 5, 7, 9, 10, 11), acoustic guitar (2, 4, 5, 6, 8), electric guitar (2), bass (1, 3, 7, 11), synth (6), percussion (8)

Additional Musicians
Greg Wieczorek - drums (all tracks), percussion (3, 5, 7, 9, 11), backing vocals (11)
John Pirruccello - slide guitar (1), pedal steel (6, 11)
Chris Carmichael - violin, viola & cello (2, 4)
Jonathan Wilson - electric guitar (3)
Glenn Kotche - triangle (3), percussion (6)
Brad Jones - bass (5)
Nick Photinos - cello (5, 7, 10)

References

2010 albums
The Autumn Defense albums